The smallspine spookfish (Harriotta haeckeli) is a species of fish in the family Rhinochimaeridae with a rather disjunct population. Its natural habitat is open seas.

Taxonomy 
This species was first described by Christine Karrer in 1972. It has been hypothesised that some records of H. raleighana might refer to H. haeckeli.

This species is named in honor of both the research vessel Ernst Haeckel, from which type was collected, and to the eminent zoologist Ernst Haeckel (1834-1919) for whom the ship was named.

Description 
H. haeckeli is a small species compared to others in its genus and is coloured pale brown with darker shading on its underside.

Distribution 
This species can be found off western Greenland, the Canary Islands, northeastern North America, Namibia, the southeastern Indian Ocean, Tasmania and southwestern New Zealand. It normally lives at depths greater than 1500 m.

Conservation status 
This species is threatened by habitat loss. However, in June 2018 the New Zealand Department of Conservation classified the smallspine spookfish as "Not Threatened" under the New Zealand Threat Classification System. The IUCN has classified this species as of Least Concern.

References

smallspine spookfish
Fish of Greenland
Marine fish of Tasmania
Fish of the South Island
Taxa named by Christine Karrer
smallspine spookfish
Taxonomy articles created by Polbot